is a former Japanese football player.

Playing career
Maeda was born in Marugame on 3 June 1973. After graduating from Doshisha University, he joined J1 League club Verdy Kawasaki in 1996. However he could not play at all in the match behind Shinkichi Kikuchi and Kenji Honnami until 1997. In 1998, he moved to Vissel Kobe and he became a regular goalkeeper from the middle of 1998. However he could not play at all in the match behind Jiro Takeda from the middle of 1999. In 2000, he moved to Shimizu S-Pulse. However he could not play at all in the match behind Masanori Sanada. In 2001, he moved to J2 League club Albirex Niigata. However he could hardly play in the match behind Yosuke Nozawa. In 2004, he moved to Albirex Niigata Singapore. He played many matches and retired end of 2004 season.

Club statistics

References

External links

1973 births
Living people
Doshisha University alumni
Association football people from Kagawa Prefecture
Japanese footballers
J1 League players
J2 League players
Tokyo Verdy players
Vissel Kobe players
Shimizu S-Pulse players
Albirex Niigata players
Association football goalkeepers